The 2009–10 TFF First League (also known as Bank Asya First League due to sponsoring reasons) is the 47th season of the second-level football league of Turkey since its establishment in 1963–64.

Teams
2008–09 TFF First League champions Manisaspor, runners-up Diyarbakırspor and play-off winners Kasımpaşa were promoted to the 2009–10 Süper Lig. They were replaced by Konyaspor, Kocaelispor and Hacettepe, who ended the 2008–09 season in the bottom three places of the standings.

Sakaryaspor, Güngören Belediyespor and Malatyaspor were relegated to the Second League after finishing in the last three spots of the 2008–09 First League season standings. They were replaced by Second League teams Bucaspor, Mersin İdmanyurdu and Çanakkale Dardanelspor.

Team summaries

Managerial changes

League table

Results

Promotion playoffs
The teams ranked third through sixth have competed in the promotion playoffs for the 2010–11 Süper Lig. The games have been played at Atatürk Olympic Stadium and Ali Sami Yen Stadium in 17, 20 and 23 of May, 2010.

Game results:

Top goalscorers
Including matches played on 9 May 2010; Source: TFF

References

See also
 2009–10 Türkiye Kupası
 2009–10 Süper Lig
 2009–10 TFF Second League

TFF First League seasons
Turkey
1